There have been 20 managers in the history of the Seattle Mariners Major League Baseball (MLB) franchise. The Mariners franchise was formed in 1977 as a member of the American League. Darrell Johnson was hired as the first Mariners manager, serving for just over three seasons before being replaced during the 1980 season. In terms of tenure, Lou Piniella has managed more games and seasons than any other coach in their franchise history. He managed the Mariners to four playoff berths (1995, 1997, 2000 and 2001), led the team to the American League Championship Series in 1995, 2000 and 2001, and won the Manager of the Year award in 1995 and 2001. Until 2022, Piniella was the only manager in Mariners history to lead a team into the playoffs, with one of those times after a 116-win season, tying the record for most wins in a season. None of the previous managers had made it to the playoffs before. Piniella, however, managed the team in 34 playoff games, winning 15 and losing 19. Dick Williams is the only Mariners manager to have been inducted into the Baseball Hall of Fame.

There have been nine interim managers in Mariners history. In 1980, manager Darrell Johnson was replaced by Maury Wills. In 1981, manager Rene Lachemann replaced Maury Wills. In 1983, Lachemann was relieved by Del Crandall. Crandall did not last a full season either, as Chuck Cottier took over his job in 1984. By 1986, Cottier was replaced with a temporary manager, Marty Martinez. After one game, the Mariners found Dick Williams to take over the role of manager. He in turn was replaced by Jim Snyder in 1988. In 2007, manager Mike Hargrove resigned in a surprise move amidst a winning streak, citing increased difficulty in putting forth the same effort he demanded of his players. Hargrove was replaced with bench coach John McLaren midseason. A year later, in 2008, the Mariners front office decided McLaren was not performing by their standards, and was fired and replaced by interim manager Jim Riggleman. New general manager Jack Zduriencik hired Don Wakamatsu as skipper for the 2009 season; after finishing the season with a .525 winning percentage, the team's poor performance coupled with off-field issues led to Wakamatsu's firing on August 9, 2010. Daren Brown, who was the manager of the Mariners' Triple-A affiliate, the Tacoma Rainiers, managed the Mariners for the remainder of the 2010 season. Eric Wedge was hired to manage the team for the 2011 to 2013 seasons. Lloyd McClendon was hired as the Mariners' manager on November 7, 2013.

Key

Statistics are accurate through the end of the 2019 MLB season.

Managers

Notes
 A running total of the number of managers of the Mariners. Thus any manager who has had two or more terms as manager is only counted once.

References

 
Seattle Mariners
Managers